The following is a list of notable people who were either born in, lived in, are current residents of, or are closely associated with the city of Dumaguete, in Negros Oriental, a province in Negros Island, Philippines.

Business, Economics, and Finance
 Juanita Amatong, Philippine Secretary of Finance and first woman executive director in the World Bank Group

Cinema and Broadcast Arts
 Elizabeth Cooper [Isabel Rosario Cooper], actress and mistress of Gen. Douglas MacArthur
 Glydel Mercado, actress
 Gino Antonio, actor
 Theodore Boborol, director
 Beauty Gonzalez, actress and Pinoy Big Brother: Teen Edition Plus 4th Teen Placer
 Bret Jackson, actor and Pinoy Big Brother housemate
 Eddie Romero, director, screenwriter, and National Artist for Cinema and Broadcast Arts
 Dennis Trillo, actor, model, singer, and TV host

Education and Library Science
 Leonor Briones, Secretary of the Department of Education and former Treasurer of the Philippines

Historical Figures
 Dios Buhawi, revolutionary
 León Kilat, revolutionary
 Papa Isio, revolutionary

Law
 Edgardo Delos Santos, Associate Justice of the Supreme Court
 Felix Makasiar, Chief Justice of the Supreme Court

Literature and Historiography

 Merlie M. Alunan, poet and Carlos Palanca Memorial Award winner
 César Ruiz Aquino, poet, fictionist, SEAWrite awardee, and four-time Carlos Palanca Memorial Award winner
 Ian Casocot, fictionist and Carlos Palanca Memorial Award winner
 Elsa Martinez Coscolluela, poet, fictionist, playwright, co-founder of the IYAS National Writers Workshop, and Carlos Palanca Memorial Award Hall-of-Famer<ref>"An Interview with In My Father’s House Author, Elsa Martinez Coscolluela". NCCA. Accessed July 20, 2017.</.</ref>
 Leoncio P. Deriada, poet, fictionist, playwright and Carlos Palanca Memorial Award Hall-of-Famer
 Lakambini Sitoy, fictionist and Carlos Palanca Memorial Award winner
 Edilberto Tiempo, novelist, critic, co-founder of the Silliman University National Writers Workshop, and SEAWrite awardee 
 Edith Tiempo, poet, novelist, critic, co-founder of the Silliman University National Writers Workshop, and National Artist for Literature
 Rowena Tiempo Torrevillas, poet, fictionist, essayist, and Carlos Palanca Memorial Award winner

Media and Journalism
 Crispin Maslog, journalist and educator

Military and Law Enforcement
 Dionardo Carlos, 27th Chief of the Philippine National Police
 Cirilito Sobejana, general, incumbent Chairman of the Joint Chiefs of Armed Forces of the Philippines, and recipient of the Medal of Valor

Music
 Rico Blanco, singer
 Boboy Garovillo, singer and member of APO Hiking Society
 Kyle Juliano, pop singer
 Budoy Marabiles, reggae musician

Politics, Diplomacy, and Civic Work
 Juanita Amatong, former Secretary of the Department of Finance
 Kira Danganan-Azucena, diplomat
 Emilio Macias, provincial governor
 José E. Romero, congressman, senator, first Philippine Ambassador to the Court of St. James's and former Secretary of the Department of Education
 Jose V. Romero Jr., Philippine Ambassador to Italy
 Lorenzo Teves, senator
 Margarito Teves, congressman and former Secretary of the Department of Finance
 Hermenegildo Villanueva, senator

Religion and Theology

 Mariano Bernad, last Spanish colonial parish priest of Dumaguete and historian
 Bishop Julito Buhisan Cortes, incumbent bishop of the Roman Catholic Diocese of Dumaguete
 Bishop John F. Du, third bishop of the Roman Catholic Diocese of Dumaguete
 Antonio Fortich, Catholic bishop and social activist
 Bishop Angel Lagdameo, second bishop of the Roman Catholic Diocese of Dumaguete
 Ryan Jimenez, Bishop of the Roman Catholic Diocese of Chalan Kanoa in the Northern Mariana Islands

Sciences
 Angel C. Alcala, biologist and National Scientist

Sports and Athletics

 Jennifer Dy Chan, archer and Olympian
 Mark Javier, archer and Philippine delegate to the Beijing Olympics
 Marlon Maro, football coach and former international football player
 Paula Lynn Obanana, international badminton player
 Jerom Lastimosa, Adamson Soaring Falcons college basketball player

Theatre Arts
 Junix Inocian, actor
 Frances Makil-Ignacio, actor

Visual Arts [Painting, Sculpture, Photography, Mixed Media, and Performance Art]
 Paul Pfeiffer, multimedia artist

See also
 List of people from Bacolod

References

People from Dumaguete
People from Negros Oriental
Lists of people by city in the Philippines